Arthur Wellington Sweeney (20 May 1909 – 27 December 1940) was an English athlete who competed for Great Britain in the 1936 Summer Olympics.

He was born in Dublin, Ireland and was killed in a flying accident in Takoradi, Gold Coast, while serving as a wing commander in the Royal Air Force during the Second World War in 1940 aged 31. He was buried at the Takoradi European Public Cemetery.

In 1936 he was eliminated in the semi-finals of the 100 metres event and in the first round of the 200 metres competition.

At the 1934 Empire Games he won the gold medal in the 100 yards contest and in the 220 yards event. He was also a member of the English relay team which won the gold medal in the 4×110 yards competition.

References

External links

1909 births
1940 deaths
Sportspeople from Dublin (city)
English male sprinters
Olympic athletes of Great Britain
Athletes (track and field) at the 1936 Summer Olympics
Athletes (track and field) at the 1934 British Empire Games
Commonwealth Games gold medallists for England
Commonwealth Games medallists in athletics
Victims of aviation accidents or incidents in Africa
Accidental deaths in Ghana
European Athletics Championships medalists
Victims of aviation accidents or incidents in 1940
Royal Air Force wing commanders
Royal Air Force personnel killed in World War II
Military personnel from Dublin (city)
Medallists at the 1934 British Empire Games